Johnny English Reborn is a motion picture soundtrack to the 2011 film of the same name written by the English film composer Ilan Eshkeri. The song "I Believe in You" by Rumer, that is heard in the end credits of the film, is not included in the soundtrack.

Track listing
The track listing for the Johnny English Reborn soundtrack is shown below.

Personnel
Instrumentation:
Andy Burrows- Drums
Tim Wheeler- Guitar
Guy Pratt- Bass
Natalie Holt- Solo Violinist
London Metropolitan Orchestra- Orchestra

Other Credits:
Conductor/ Orchestra Contractor- Andy Brown
Orchestrators- Jessica Dannheisser, Robert Elhai, Jeff Toyne
Score Mixers/ Recorders- Steve McLaughlin (also serving as music producer), Jason Elliott, and finally Gordon Davidson
Music Preparation- Vic Fraser
Other credits on IMDB: https://www.imdb.com/title/tt1634122/fullcredits/?ref_=tt_ov_st_sm

Johnny English
2011 soundtrack albums